6IX (stylised as 6iX) is a commercial radio station in Perth, Western Australia, broadcasting a classic hits and oldies format from its studios in Osborne Park. First broadcast in 1933, the station is currently owned and operated as a joint venture by Capital Radio Network and Grant Broadcasters.

History
6IX was first opened on 27 November 1933 by Sir John Kirwan, the then-President of the Western Australian Legislative Council. Operated by W.A. Broadcasters Ltd, the station first broadcast on 1240 kHz AM, until 1935 when it moved to 1080 AM. In 1970 TVW enterprises bought 6IX and moved it to its studios in Tuart Hill (Dianella). In the mid-1980s it moved to 169 Hay Street East Perth where 6PR and 96FM are today broadcast from.

In 1988, 6IX was bought by the Austereo Radio Network, with a view to obtaining one of the two AM-FM conversions licences to be made available in Perth. Austereo assigned the station a new callsign, 6GL, and the station was branded on-air as The Eagle 1080 AM. However, Austereo failed to obtain one of the AM-FM conversions on auction and subsequently sold the radio station to regional operator Radio West, who reinstated the original 6IX callsign.

In 1998, 6IX was purchased by the Capital Radio Network and Grant Broadcasters.

References

External links
 Official website

Radio stations in Perth, Western Australia
Radio stations established in 1933
Classic hits radio stations in Australia
Oldies radio stations in Australia
Capital Radio Network
Grant Broadcasters